Edwyn Gray (born 1927) is a British writer who specialises in naval writing although at times has written short stories.

He was born in London and educated at the Royal Grammar School, High Wycombe. He read economics at the University of London and then joined the British civil service. His writing career began in 1953 when he started writing for magazines. His first book was published in 1969, and he became a full-time writer in 1980. He moved to Norfolk and devoted his time to writing, research and consultancy.

Bibliography
His books have been published both in the United Kingdom and the United States, and many have been translated into other languages. His works include:
A damned un-English weapon: the story of British submarine warfare, 1914–18 (1971)
The underwater war; submarines, 1914–1918 (1971)
The Killing Time: the U-boat War, 1914–18 (1972)
The Devil's device: the story of Robert Whitehead, inventor of the torpedo (1975)
Fighting submarine (1979)
Diving Stations (1984)
Crash dive 500 (1985)
Few survived: a comprehensive survey of submarine accidents and disasters (1986)
Submarine Warriors (1989)
Operation Pacific: the Royal Navy's war against Japan, 1941–1945 (1991)
Hitler's Battleships (1993)
The U-Boat War, 1914–1918 (1994)
Nineteenth-century torpedoes and their inventors (2004)

References

British military writers
British short story writers
20th-century British novelists
21st-century British novelists
People educated at the Royal Grammar School, High Wycombe
Living people
Writers from London
British male novelists
British male short story writers
20th-century British short story writers
21st-century British short story writers
20th-century English male writers
21st-century English male writers
1927 births